BedMachine Antarctica is a project to map the sub-surface landmass below the ice of Antarctica using data from radar depth sounding and ice shelf bathymetry methods and computer analysis of that data based on the conservation of mass.

The project is uses data from 19 research institutes.  It is led by the University of California, Irvine.

References

External links 
 

Antarctica
Geophysics
Research projects